The 1936 Xavier Musketeers football team was an American football team that represented Xavier University as an independent during the 1936 college football season. In its second season under head coach Clem Crowe, the team compiled a 6–4 record and outscored all opponents by a total of 166 to 102. The team played its home games at Xavier Stadium, also known as Corcoran Field, in Cincinnati.

Schedule

References

Xavier
Xavier Musketeers football seasons
Xavier Musketeers football